Hot Ice  is a 2009 television series produced by Star Media which aired on Channel One

In the series both professional actors and iceskaters took part.

Plot 
The film begins with the Russian Figure Skating Championships, where there is a tough fight for a ticket to the European Championship. The competition is not over yet, but the leaders have already decided: the first Nikolay Rokotov and Alexandra Belkevich, followed by Vera Loginova and Sergey Bratsev. For the third place fighting pair Zorina — Davydenko and Trofimova — Molodtsov. Couple  Trofimova —  Molodtsov, seeing that the odds are not high, take risks. In defiance of coach Alexander Trofimov, who is also the father of Natalia Trofimova, they include in its program of complex support.

During his speech, Viktor Molodtsov notices in the stands his former sweetheart, figure skater Berkovskaya, which a few years ago went to America. Molodtsov wrong and Natalya drops on the ice. As a result of severe trauma Natalia can not pursue a career skater. But she can not imagine her life without ice, and now she has to prove to himself and others, that her career is not finished in the sport.

Cast
 Yekaterina Guseva  as Natalia Trofimova
 Alexei Tikhonov as Nikolay Rokotov
  Pavel Trubiner  as Sergey Bratsev
 Maria Anikanova as Anna Berkovskaya
 Roman Kostomarov as Viktor Molodtsov
Anna Bolshova as Sasha Belkevich
 Alexei Yagudin as Roma Kozyrev
 Alexander Abt as Maxim Voronin
 Boris Nevzorov as coach Trofimov
 Irina Slutskaya as coach Ivanova
 Lyudmila Artemieva as Violetta Konstantinovna
 Agniya Kuznetsova as Asya Samsonova
 Vyacheslav Grishechkin as Vitaly Borisovich Smylkin, director of the Ice Palace

Shooting group 
Directors: Oleg Larin, Vladimir Filimonov, Anario Mamedov, Mikhail Kabanov
Writers: Vladimir Dyachenko, Ametkhan Magomedov, Svetlana Korolyova, Igor Mityushin, Konstantin Chepurin, Andrey Galanov  
Сinematographer: Anna Kuranova
Composer: Sergey Paramonov
Artist: Konstantin Vinokurov
Producers: Vitaly Bordachyov, Vladislav Ryashin, Ilya Averbukh

References

External links
    
 Смотреть на официальном канале
 Ruskino.ru

2009 telenovelas
2009 Russian television series debuts
2009 Russian television series endings
Russian telenovelas
2000s Russian television series
Figure skating films
Channel One Russia original programming